School District of Alma Center-Humbird-Merrillan is a school district headquartered in Alma Center, Wisconsin. It operates Lincoln Elementary School in Merrillan and Lincoln Junior-Senior High School in Alma Center. It also serves Humbird.

References

External links
 
 Lincoln Junior-Senior High School
 Lincoln Elementary School

School districts in Wisconsin
Education in Clark County, Wisconsin
Education in Jackson County, Wisconsin